Aldo Ralli (21 October 1935 – 6 March 2016) was an Italian stage, film and television actor.

Life and career 
Born in Pisa, Ralli started his career on stage, as the sidekick of popular comedians such as Erminio Macario, Carlo Dapporto and Beniamino Maggio. With the decline of revue and avanspettacolo, from the late 1970s he specialized in character roles, being cast in dozens of comedy films. He also worked several times with Paolo Sorrentino, and among his most successful performances there was the role of  Captain Cavicchi in the Italia 1 TV-series Classe di ferro.

Partial filmography 

Ric e Gian alla conquista del West (1967) - mister James
The Great Silence (1968) - Al's Deputy (uncredited)
Isabella, duchessa dei diavoli (1969) - Baron's Doctor
Lisa dagli occhi blu (1970)
Le segrete esperienze di Luca e Fanny (1980) - Fanny's Father
Delitto a Porta Romana (1980) - Professor Baldi
La dottoressa di campagna (1981) - Don Anselmo
Chiamate 6969: taxi per signora (1981)
Crime at the Chinese Restaurant (1981) - Customs Office Director
Pierino il fichissimo (1981) - Romolo
La casa stregata (1982)
Biancaneve & Co... (1982) - Dammelo
Delitto sull'autostrada (1982) - Camionista
Emanuelle in the Country (1982) - Remo Bianchi
Il diavolo e l'acquasanta (1983) - Allenatore
Crime in Formula One (1984) - Daniele Bertoni
Roma. L'antica chiave dei sensi (1984) - Midas
Roba da ricchi (1987) - Insurance Manager
Il volpone (1988) - Prete
Rimini Rimini - Un anno dopo (1988) - Pisciasotto' - Nicola's friend ("La legge del taglione)
Abbronzatissimi (1991) - Uomo importante
Mutande pazze (1992) - Nando Crass
Vacanze sulla neve (1999) - Pino, hotel director
Fantozzi 2000 – La clonazione (1999) - Scienziato
Pazzo d'amore (1999)
Il divo (2008) - Giuseppe Ciarrapico
The Great Beauty (2013) - Cardinale
Youth (2015) - Hotel Manager (final film role)

References

External links  

 
 

People from Pisa
1935 births  
2016 deaths  
Italian male stage actors
Italian male film actors
Italian male television actors
20th-century Italian male actors